Pharsalia pulchra is a species of beetle in the family Cerambycidae. It was described by Charles Joseph Gahan in 1888. It is known from Malaysia, Cambodia, China, Thailand, Indonesia, and Vietnam.

Subspecies
 Pharsalia pulchra niasica Aurivillius, 1920
 Pharsalia pulchra pulchra Gahan, 1888

References

pulchra
Beetles described in 1888